Hans Grässel (August 8, 1860 – March 10 or 11, 1939) was a German architect. Grässel studied and performed almost his entire career in Munich, and as the council architect of the city he created a series of cemeteries of which Munich Waldfriedhof (Munich woodlands cemetery), opened in 1907,  is well known for being the first woodland cemetery. Grässel also wrote a pamphlet on cemetery design, Über Friedhofanlagen und Grabdenkmale (1913). In 1914, he was given the order Pour le Mérite.

Notes

References
 Constant, Caroline: The Woodland Cemetery, chapter 1. Byggförlaget 1994, 
 

20th-century German architects
1860 births
1939 deaths
Architects from Munich
Recipients of the Pour le Mérite (civil class)